or  (Clinics Hospital) is a denomination traditionally reserved for teaching hospitals in Brazil.

There are several hospitals under these names in Brazil:

 Hospital das Clínicas da Universidade de São Paulo, one of the three teaching hospitals of the University of São Paulo, São Paulo, the two others being:
 Hospital Universitário da Universidade de São Paulo, in São Paulo
 Hospital das Clínicas de Ribeirão Preto, at the Faculdade de Medicina de Ribeirão Preto, in Ribeirão Preto, state of Sâo Paulo
 Hospital de Clínicas da Universidade Estadual de Campinas, teaching hospital of the State University of Campinas, in Campinas, state of São Paulo
 Hospital de Clínicas de Porto Alegre of the Universidade Federal do Rio Grande do Sul, Porto Alegre, state of Rio Grande do Sul

Other institutions are:
 Hospital das Clínicas da Universidade Federal do Paraná, in Curitiba, state of Paraná
 Hospital Universitário Clementino Fraga Filho of the Federal University of Rio de Janeiro, in Rio de Janeiro
 Hospital Universitário Pedro Ernesto of the University of the State of Rio de Janeiro, in Rio de Janeiro
 Hospital Universitário Polydoro Ernani de São Thiago of the Federal University of Santa Catarina, in Florianópolis, Santa Catarina
 Hospital Universitário Prof. Alberto Antunes of the Federal University of Alagoas, in Maceió, Alagoas
 Hospital das Clínicas of Federal University of Goiás, in Goiânia, Goiás

See also
 Hospital de Clínicas "José de San Martín", in Argentina
 Hospital de Clínicas "Dr. Manuel Quintela", in Uruguay